The Bagban are a Muslim community found in North as well as the Deccan areas of West India. In the Deccan region they are known as Bagwan.

History and origin
According to some traditions, the Bagban belong Muslim community. Baghban literally means gardener in the Persian and Urdu languages. The term is exactly the same as the Hindi term Mali, which also means gardener.

The Bagban have four subdivisions, the Kachhi, Murao, Kunbi and Mali, suggesting that they are Muslim from these communities.

Present circumstances
The Bagban are a community of farmers, growing and selling vegetables such as potatoes and onions. Their landholdings are small, and many are sharecroppers. The Bagban are thus distinct from the Kunjra, who are a landless community.

The Bagban have a formal community association, the Bagban Mohammadi Imdadi Association (Bagban Muslim Welfare Association). This community association campaigns on behalf of the Bagban community and has replaced the traditional community council. They are an endogamous community, with all three sub-communities marrying each other. 

The Bagban are concentrated in the Awadh region, found mainly in the districts of Allahabad, Bahraich, Barabanki, Faizabad, Gorakhpur, Kanpur, Lukhnow, Sitapur and Sultanpur. They are found in Maharashtra communities such as Jalgaon, Bhusawal, Dhule, Malegaon, Ratnagiri, Mumbai, Solapur, Satara, Sanagli, and Kolhapur. In Madhya Pradesh they are found in communities such as Indore, Bhopal, Ujjiain, Tiaras, Zhansi, Gwalier. In Karnataka they are found in communities such as Wadi Bijapur, Gulbarga, Banglore, Hubli, and Gadag. They speak Hindi, Urdu, Marathi and local languages also, Awadhi among themselves, and Urdu with members of other communities. Many members of this community migrated to Pakistan in 1947 and have settled in Karachi and Sindh.

Bagwan of Deccan
The Bagban or Bagwan as they are called in Dakhni are found mainly in the Deccan region, i.e., Maharashtra, parts of Andhra Pradesh (mainly Telangana) and Karnataka and (North Karnataka). The present day Bagwan community is mostly engaged in trading and act as commission agents and wholesalers and retailers of fruits and vegetables. In some towns of the Deccan they dominate the wholesale trade in fruits and vegetables in the APMC markets.

The present-day Bagwan community of Maharashtra is classified as an OBC and accordingly provided reservations in education and government jobs in Maharashtra state.

Recently the Bagwan community has taken initiative to spread education in the community in particular and Muslims in general through the Bagban Educational Trust. There are over 5000 active Bagban members in a Bagwan/Bagban group on Facebook created in 2007.

Historical perspective
The 1884 notes about Bagwan community of the Marathwada region in the Gazetteer of Aurangabad are as follows:

The Baghbans literally means gardeners. The Hindustani baghbans came originally from Northern India with Aurangzeb. They speak Urdu, and dress in the Dakhani style. The Punjabi maiva-farosh do not differ much in dress or appearance from the last, except that they are called Punjabi, but they both really form one community, and eat and intermarry with each other. The Dakhani baghbans are mainly descended from local Kunbi community, are found in large numbers in towns and large villages. They wear a large turban of a rather jaunty make, a chindar, anga, and either a paijama or dhoti; while the women use the sadi and choli. They nominally belong to the Hanafi sect of Sunnis. They work in gardens, and are wholesale and retail vendors of vegetables. They speak Urdu and Marathi, but do not intermarry with the Hindustani Kunjra or the Punjabi maiva-farosh.

Notable Bagban people
 Isaque Ibrahim Bagwan (Retired Assistant Commissioner of Police)
 Riaz Bagwan (Indian cricketer)
 Mohammad Shafi Bagwan (Chairman of Chand Fruits Co (Pvt) Ltd)
 Dr Makbul Bagwan (Ex MLA Karnataka State.)

See also
Kunjra
 Maliar

References

External links

Muhajir communities
Social groups of Madhya Pradesh
Muslim communities of Maharashtra
Social groups of Karnataka
Muslim communities of Uttar Pradesh
Muslim communities of Karnataka